The Tacuarí River is a river in Cerro Largo Department, Uruguay.

See also
List of rivers of Uruguay

References

Rand McNally, The New International Atlas, 1993
 GEOnet Names Server

Rivers of Uruguay
Rivers of Cerro Largo Department